Kitsada Hemvipat (born May 19, 1984) is a Thai professional footballer who plays as a defensive midfielder for Thai League 3 club Khon Kaen.

References

1984 births
Living people
Kitsada Hemvipat
Kitsada Hemvipat
Association football midfielders
Kitsada Hemvipat
Kitsada Hemvipat
Kitsada Hemvipat